Gisèle Pineau (born 18 May 1956) is a French novelist, writer and former psychiatric nurse. Although born in Paris, her origins are Guadeloupean and she has written several books on the difficulties and torments of her childhood as a Black person growing up in Parisian society.

Early life and career 
In 1956, Gisèle Pineau was born in Paris, France. During her youth, she divided her time between France and Guadeloupe due to her father's stationing in the military. Pineau struggled with her identity as a Black immigrant due to the racism and xenophobia she experienced at her all-white school in the Kremlin-Bicêtre suburb.  Pineau took to writing in order to console the difficulties of her French upbringing and Caribbean heritage, as her works would connect the two cultures rather than separating them. She is aligned with the créolité literary movement, and in the 1990s was among the most prominent of Guadeloupean créolité-adjacent writers, alongside .

In her writings, she uses the oral tradition of storytelling in fictional works to reclaim the narratives of Caribbean culture. She also focuses on racism and the effects it can have on a young girl trying to discover her own cultural identity. Her book L'Exil Selon Julia highlights this, as she relies on the memories and experiences of her aged grandmother to help her learn about her society's traditions and her own cultural background. In the book, she also mentions that the discrimination she felt as a child did not only apply to French society in Paris, but also to the people of Guadeloupe, who rejected her for being too cosmopolitan upon her return to the land of her ancestors.

She for many years lived in Paris and, whilst maintaining her writing career, has also returned to being a psychiatric nurse in order to balance out her life;  but she recently has moved back to Guadeloupe.

Bibliography 

 1992: Un papillon dans la cité
 1993: La Grande Drive des esprits, Grand prix des lectrices de Elle
 1995: L'Espérance-Macadam, Prix RFO du livre (1996)
 1996: L'Exil selon Julia
 1998: L’âme prêtée aux oiseaux
 1998: Le cyclone Marilyn
 1998: Femmes des Antilles
 1999: Caraïbe sur Seine
 2001: Case mensonge
 2002: Chair piment
 2004: Les colères du Volcan
 2005: Fleur de barbarie
 2007: Mes quatre femmes
 2007: C'est la règle
 2008: Morne Câpresse
 2010: Folie, aller simple
 2010: L’odyssée d’Alizée
 2012: Cent Vies et des Poussières
 2015: Les voyages de Merry Sisal

References

External links
 Gisèle Pineau
 L'Exil Selon Julia (Exile according to Julia)

20th-century French novelists
21st-century French novelists
20th-century French women writers
1956 births
French people of Guadeloupean descent
Living people
21st-century French women writers
Writers from Paris
Créolité